Vincent Belnome (born March 11, 1988) is an American former professional baseball infielder. He has played in Major League Baseball (MLB) for the Tampa Bay Rays.

Career

San Diego Padres
Belnome was drafted by the San Diego Padres in the 28th round, 834th overall in the 2009 Major League Baseball Draft. He signed with the Padres on June 15, 2009. He spent the year with the Eugene Emeralds and Fort Wayne TinCaps. Belnome spent the entire 2010 season with the Lake Elsinore Storm. He spent the entire 2011 season with the San Antonio Missions. Belnome spent 2012 with Lake Elsinore and the Tucson Padres.

Tampa Bay Rays
The Tampa Bay Rays acquired Belnome from the San Diego Padres for Chris Rearick on December 13, 2012. He spent the 2013 season with the Durham Bulls. He was added to the 40-man roster on November 20, 2013.

Belnome was called up to the major leagues on April 3, 2014, but was sent back down the next day without appearing in a game. Belnome made his major league debut on July 3, 2014. He spent the rest of the year between Durham and Tampa Bay. On November 7, 2014, Belnome was outrighted off of the roster. He began the year with Durham but was released on July 22, 2015.

New York Mets
Belnome signed a minor league deal with the New York Mets on July 28, 2015. He elected free agency on November 6.

References

External links

1988 births
Living people
Tampa Bay Rays players
West Virginia Mountaineers baseball players
Eugene Emeralds players
Fort Wayne TinCaps players
Lake Elsinore Storm players
San Antonio Missions players
Tucson Padres players
Arizona League Padres players
Durham Bulls players
Estrellas Orientales players
American expatriate baseball players in the Dominican Republic
Major League Baseball infielders